Safi Taha (23 December 1923 – 22 February 2009) was a Lebanese wrestler. He competed at the 1948 Summer Olympics and the 1952 Summer Olympics.

References

External links
 

1923 births
2009 deaths
Lebanese male sport wrestlers
Olympic wrestlers of Lebanon
Wrestlers at the 1948 Summer Olympics
Wrestlers at the 1952 Summer Olympics
Sportspeople from Beirut